Atriplex canescens (or chamiso, chamiza, four-wing saltbush)  is a species of evergreen shrub in the family Amaranthaceae native to the western and midwestern United States.

Description
Atriplex canescens has a highly variable form, and readily hybridizes with several other species in the genus Atriplex.  The degree of polyploidy also results in variations in form.  Its height can vary from 1 foot to 10 feet, but 2 to 4 feet is most common.  The leaves are thin and 0.5 to 2 inches long.

It is most readily identified by the fruits, which have four wings at roughly 90 degree angles and are densely packed on long stems.

This species blooms from April to October.

Habitat
Fourwing saltbush is most common in early succession areas such as disturbed sites and active sand dunes.  It is also found in more mature successions dominated by sagebrush—Artemisia tridentata and shadscale.

Uses
Among the Zuni people,  an infusion of dried root and blossoms or a poultice of blossoms is used for ant bites. Twigs are also attached to prayer plumes and sacrificed to the cottontail rabbit to ensure good hunting. The Native American Hopi Indians preferred the ashes of four-wing saltbush for the nixtamalization of maize (the first step in the process of creating tortillas and pinole, by which the pericarp of Indian corn is removed before parching and grinding). Oftentimes the four-wing saltbush was used instead of slaked lime (hydrate lime/slaked powder lime). Four-wing saltbush is also a common marker that archaeologists can use to locate ancient Pueblo ruins, which may indicate that the small branches of this bush were burned for their alkaline ashes to nixtamalize maize by Native peoples throughout the South-Western United States.

References

External links
 USDA Plants Profile: Atriplex canescens 
 Calflora: Atriplex canescens
 Jepson Manual eFlora (TJM2) treatment of Atriplex canescens
 USDA Forest Service: Atriplex canescens
  UC Photos gallery: Atriplex canescens

canescens
Flora of California
Flora of the North-Central United States
Flora of the Northwestern United States
Flora of the South-Central United States
Flora of the Southwestern United States
Flora of Alberta
Flora of Nevada
Flora of the Great Basin
Flora of the California desert regions
Flora of the Great Plains (North America)
Flora of the Sierra Nevada (United States)
Flora of the Sonoran Deserts
Natural history of the California chaparral and woodlands
Natural history of the Mojave Desert
Natural history of the Transverse Ranges
Forages
Plants used in traditional Native American medicine
Flora without expected TNC conservation status